Major-General Vesey John Dawson, CVO (4 April 1853 – 17 January 1930) was a British Army officer.

Military career
He was the eldest son of the Hon. Thomas Vesey Dawson, an officer of the Coldstream Guards who was killed at the Battle of Inkerman; his father was the son of Richard Thomas Dawson, 2nd Baron Cremorne, and his mother the daughter of John FitzPatrick, 1st Baron Castletown. His younger brother, Douglas Dawson, was also an Army officer. Vesey Dawson attended Eton College, where his housemaster was Oscar Browning.

He joined the Coldstream Guards in 1871, and served with the Nile Expedition of 1884–85, seeing action at the Battle of Abu Klea. He was promoted to Lieutenant-Colonel in 1897, and appointed to command the newly raised Irish Guards in 1900. On 30 May 1902 he was appointed Commander of the Royal Victorian Order (CVO), following the presentation of Colours to the Regiment. From 1906 to 1908 he commanded the 15th Infantry Brigade at Belfast, and from 1908 to 1912 he commanded the 2nd London Division of the Territorial Force, in which post he was succeeded by Charles Monro. He retired from the Army in 1914.

Notes

References
 Obituary in The Times, 20 January 1930; pg. 17

1853 births
1930 deaths
British Army major generals
People educated at Eton College
Coldstream Guards officers
Commanders of the Royal Victorian Order
Vesey
British Army personnel of the Mahdist War
Irish Guards officers
Place of birth missing
Place of death missing